That Summer may refer to:
That Summer (Drury novel), a 1965 novel by Allen Drury
That Summer!, a 1979 film starring Ray Winstone
"That Summer" (song), a 1993 song by Garth Brooks
That Summer (Dessen novel), a 1996 novel by Sarah Dessen
That Summer (Greig novel), a 2000 novel by Andrew Greig
That Summer (picture book), a 2002 children's book written by Tony Johnston and illustrated by Barry Moser
A Burning Hot Summer, a 2011 film directed by Philippe Garrel, pre-release title That Summer
That Summer (2017 film), based on recovered footage filmed at Grey Gardens in 1972